Rajamangala University of Technology Rattanakosin Salaya Campus Stadium is a multi-purpose stadium in Nakhon Pathom, Thailand.  It is currently used mostly for football matches. The stadium holds 2,000 people.

Football venues in Thailand
Multi-purpose stadiums in Thailand
Buildings and structures in Nakhon Pathom province
Sport in Nakhon Pathom province